The 1970 Alabama 500 was a NASCAR Grand National Series event that was held on April 12, 1970, at Alabama International Motor Speedway (now Talladega Superspeedway) in Talladega, Alabama. As the inaugural running of what is now known as the GEICO 500, it helped to serve as a prime example of Talladega races yet to come.

Nord Krauskopf's Bobby Isaac won the pole position, and the race was won by Petty Enterprises's Pete Hamilton.

Background
Alabama International Motor Speedway (AIMS), later known as Talladega Superspeedway, is a motorsports complex located north of Talladega, Alabama. It is located on the former Anniston Air Force Base in the small city of Lincoln. The track is a Tri-oval and was constructed by International Speedway Corporation, a business controlled by the France Family, in the 1960s. Talladega is most known for its steep banking and the unique location of the start/finish line – located just past the exit to pit road. The track currently hosts the NASCAR series such as the NASCAR Cup Series, NASCAR Xfinity Series, and the NASCAR Truck Series.

Qualifying

Failed to qualify: Dick May (#67), J.D. McDuffie, Johnny Halford (#57), Wayne Smith

Race report
The ABC broadcast picked up the action just after halfway at about lap 100. One of the announcers highlighted what had happened during the untelevised part of the race by showing scale models of the cars that started up front and talking about where they were now. However, the race was hard to watch on television as the announcers and apparently even NASCAR officials struggled to figure out who was leading at the end; making for a very poor and unprofessional finish. The TV crew thought Bobby Isaac was the leader and was confused when Hamilton was given the checkered flag. The broadcast crew left the air before the victory lane interview, thinking that Pete Hamilton won the race.

A crowd of 36,000 was present at the race.

32 lead changes occurred between eight drivers: Buddy Baker, Hamilton, Isaac, David Pearson, Cale Yarborough, Richard Brickhouse, Charlie Glotzbach and Bobby Allison.

Bill Shirey blew his engine on lap 3 while Dale Alonzo inflicted terminal damage on lap 10. Further engine failures on the vehicles of Don Tarr on lap 17, Richard Brickhouse on lap 25, Bobby Mausgrover on the same lap, and E.J. Trivette on lap 73. Henley Gray's steering forced his exit on lap 78. Jim Vandiver overheated his vehicle on lap 93. Two more engine failures as Raymond Williams had to leave the race on lap 107 and Charlie Glotzbach on lap 117. Bill Champion's vehicle developed an oil leak on lap 125 while Bobby Allison lost his engine on lap 126. Elmo Langley could not continue the race due to a faulty engine on lap 149. Water pump issues took Ron Keselowski of the race while Alton Jones had to settle for a 24th-place finish due to engine problems on lap 155. Longtime Alabama independent driver Ben Arnold fielded cars for Alton Jones and himself. Cale Yarborough lost several laps on pit road when his car wouldn't refire, while Richard Petty lost a couple more laps himself when the crew had to go under the hood of the #43 Plymouth.

Notable crew chiefs at this race included Harry Hyde, Dale Inman, Maurice Petty, Tom Vandiver, Tom Ingram, Dick Hutcherson and Glen Wood.

Baker's accident
Even though Buddy Baker led the most laps with 101 (along with having a nine-second distance between  Pete Hamilton by lap 170), pit road problems allowed Hamilton to lap him. Baker began to close in on Hamilton. However, Baker's tire blew heading into the fourth turn on lap 175; fragments of the tire would ultimately damage the engine cooler that resulted in a serious fire for his Dodge. Baker attempted to put out the fire by spinning into the grass.

Baker suffered second-degree burns to the legs and face but was subsequently released from the hospital. When asked about the incident, Baker stated, "it was the scariest thing that ever happened to me. I don't really mind losing this time; I'm just happy to be alive." Baker would finish 12th, as Hamilton led the final 18 laps to give him the victory, with a 44-second lead over second-place finisher Isaac; Pearson, Benny Parsons and Yarborough closed out the top five. The win was Hamilton's second of the season, and Hamilton would eventually win the second Talladega race.

Finishing order
''Source:

References

Alabama 500
Alabama 500
NASCAR races at Talladega Superspeedway